William John King (January 4, 1864 – July 16, 1936) was a Canadian-American college football coach, athletics administrator, and Presbyterian minister. He served as the head football coach at Hampden–Sydney College's in Hampden Sydney, Virginia for one season, in 1895, and the College of William & Mary for three seasons, in 1897, 1898 and 1900, compiling a career coaching record of 3–5. King was also the athletic director at William & Mary from 1901 to 1905.

King was born on January 4, 1864, in Port Hope, Ontario and immigrated to the United States at the age of 21. He married Hallie Haxall in 1901. King retired to Newport News, Virginia around 1931 and died at his home there on July 16, 1936.

Head coaching record

References

External links
 

1864 births
1936 deaths
20th-century Presbyterian ministers
American Presbyterian ministers
Hampden–Sydney Tigers football coaches
William & Mary Tribe athletic directors
William & Mary Tribe football coaches
Sportspeople from Newport News, Virginia
People from Northumberland County, Ontario
Canadian emigrants to the United States